Agrochola macilenta, the yellow-line Quaker, is a moth of the family Noctuidae. The species was first described by Jacob Hübner in 1809. It is found in Europe (except Russia) and in Asia Minor.

The wingspan is 32–36 mm. Forewing ochreous washed with pale fulvous; the inner and outer lines very faint, marked chiefly by the dark teeth on the veins; a dark spot at base of wing; median shade variable; stigmata of the ground colour, with slight pale outlines, the lower end of the reniform nearly always black; submarginal line ochreous edged inwardly with rufous, nearly straight except for the angulation on vein 7; hindwing grey, the fringe rufous; — in the ab. nigrodentata Fuchs the basal, inner, and outer lines are all strongly marked, blackish and dentate.
The caterpillar is reddish brown with white dots, and three white lines on the back; the line along the spiracles is whitish with a dusky edge above. The head is ochreous brown and the  plate on the first ring blackish lined with white.

The moth flies from September to December depending on the location.

The larvae feed on various shrubs and deciduous trees, including Carpinus, Crataegus, Fagus, Populus, Prunus, Ulmus, Salix, Quercus, Calluna, Hieracium and Plantago.

References

External links

"09571 Agrochola macilenta (Hübner, [1809]) - Gelbbraune Herbsteule". Lepiforum e. V. Retrieved 22 January 2021. 
"Geelbruine herfstuil Agrochola macilenta". De Vlinderstichting. Retrieved 22 January 2021. 

Agrochola
Moths described in 1809
Moths of Europe
Moths of the Middle East
Taxa named by Jacob Hübner